The 1977 Spanish general election was held on Wednesday, 15 June 1977, to elect the Spanish Cortes of the Kingdom of Spain. All 350 seats in the Congress of Deputies were up for election, as well as all 207 seats in the Senate.

It was the first free election held in Spain since 1936, prior to the outbreak of the Spanish Civil War. It was called by Prime Minister Adolfo Suárez as part of the political reform of the Francoist regime, ongoing since shortly after Francisco Franco's death in 1975 and promoted by his successor, King Juan Carlos I. Its aim was to elect a Constituent Cortes that was to draft a new constitution, which would ultimately lead to the repealing of the Fundamental Laws of the Realm and the culmination of the country's transition to democracy.

The Union of the Democratic Centre (UCD), the electoral coalition created to serve as Suárez's political platform in government, emerged as the largest party overall, albeit 11 seats short of an absolute majority. The election surprise was the Spanish Socialist Workers' Party (PSOE) of Felipe González, which—supported by the German SPD and running a campaign intended to highlight González's youth and charisma—won 118 seats and became the main left-of-centre party by a wide margin. The Communist Party of Spain (PCE), which had been the main opposition force to the dictatorship, and the right-wing People's Alliance (AP) of former Francoist minister Manuel Fraga, performed below expectations. Turnout was high at 78.8%, the second highest for any nationwide election held ever since.

Overview

Electoral system
Under the 1977 Political Reform Act, the Spanish Cortes were envisaged as a provisional legislature that was to approve a new constitution in a short timespan. Initiative for constitutional amendment belonged to the Congress of Deputies, as well as to the national government. Constitutional bills required to be passed by an absolute majority in both the Congress and Senate. If the Senate rejected the bill as passed by Congress, discrepancies were to be submitted to a Mixed Commission and, if the deadlock persisted, a joint sitting of both Houses would convene as a single legislative body in order to resolve on the issue by an absolute majority. Voting for the Cortes was on the basis of universal suffrage, which comprised all nationals over 21 years of age and in full enjoyment of their civil and political rights.

For the Congress of Deputies, 348 seats were elected using the D'Hondt method and a closed list proportional representation, with an electoral threshold of three percent of valid votes—which included blank ballots—being applied in each constituency. Seats were allocated to constituencies, corresponding to the provinces of Spain. Each constituency was entitled to an initial minimum of two seats, with the remaining 248 fixed among the constituencies in proportion to their populations, at a rate of approximately one seat per each 144,500 inhabitants or fraction greater than 70,000. Ceuta and Melilla were allocated the two remaining seats, which were elected using plurality voting. The use of the D'Hondt method might result in a higher effective threshold, depending on the district magnitude.

As a result of the aforementioned allocation, each Congress multi-member constituency was entitled the following seats:

For the Senate, 207 seats were elected using an open list partial block voting system, with electors voting for individual candidates instead of parties. In constituencies electing four seats, electors could vote for up to three candidates; in those with two or three seats, for up to two candidates; and for one candidate in single-member districts. Each of the 47 peninsular provinces was allocated four seats, whereas for insular provinces, such as the Balearic and Canary Islands, districts were the islands themselves, with the larger—Majorca, Gran Canaria and Tenerife—being allocated three seats each, and the smaller—Menorca, Ibiza–Formentera, Fuerteventura, La Gomera–El Hierro, Lanzarote and La Palma—one each. Ceuta and Melilla elected two seats each. The law also provided for by-elections to fill seats vacated up to two years into the legislature. Additionally, the King could appoint senators in a number not higher than one-fifth of the elected seats.

The electoral law provided that parties, federations, coalitions and groupings of electors were allowed to present lists of candidates. However, groupings of electors were required to secure the signature of at least 0.1 percent of the electors registered in the constituency for which they sought election—needing to secure, in any case, the signature of 500 electors—. Electors were barred from signing for more than one list of candidates. Concurrently, parties and federations intending to enter in coalition to take part jointly at an election were required to inform the relevant Electoral Commission within fifteen days of the election being called.

Background

The death of Francisco Franco in 1975 paved the way for Spain's transition from an autocratic, one-party dictatorship into a democratic, constitutional monarchy. As per the Succession Law of 1947, the Spanish monarchy was restored under the figure of Juan Carlos I, who quickly became the promoter of a peaceful democratic reform of state institutions. This move was supported by western countries, an important sector of Spanish and international capitalism, a majority of the opposition to Francoism—organized into the Democratic Convergence Platform and the Democratic Junta, which in 1976 would both merge into the Democratic Coordination—and a growing part of the Franco regime itself, weary of popular mobilization after the outcome of the Carnation Revolution in neighbouring Portugal in 1974. However, as incumbent Prime Minister Carlos Arias Navarro rejected any major transformation of the Spanish political system, rather supporting the preservation of Francoist laws, he was dismissed by the King in July 1976, who appointed Adolfo Suárez for the post.

Suárez's plans for political reform involved the transformation of Spanish institutions in accordance to the Francoist legal system through the approval of a "political reform bill" as a Fundamental Law of the Realm. This was meant as a step beyond Arias Navarro's plans to update—but preserve—the Francoist regime, with Suárez intending to implement democracy "from law to law through law"—in the words of Torcuato Fernández-Miranda—without the outright liquidation of the Francoist system as called for by opposition parties. Thus, on 18 November 1976, the 1977 Political Reform Act was passed by the Francoist Cortes, later ratified in a referendum on 15 December 1976 with overwhelming popular support. As set out in Suárez's scheme, the Act called for an electoral process to elect new Cortes that were to be responsible for drafting a democratic constitution.

Parties and leaders

Opinion polls
The table below lists voting intention estimates in reverse chronological order, showing the most recent first and using the dates when the survey fieldwork was done, as opposed to the date of publication. Where the fieldwork dates are unknown, the date of publication is given instead. The highest percentage figure in each polling survey is displayed with its background shaded in the leading party's colour. If a tie ensues, this is applied to the figures with the highest percentages. The "Lead" column on the right shows the percentage-point difference between the parties with the highest percentages in a poll. When available, seat projections determined by the polling organisations are displayed below (or in place of) the percentages in a smaller font; 176 seats were required for an absolute majority in the Congress of Deputies.

Results

Congress of Deputies

Senate

Bibliography

Notes

References

Opinion poll sources

Other

General
1977 in Spain
1977
June 1977 events in Europe